George Huruma Mkuchika (born 6 October 1948) is a Tanzanian CCM politician and Member of Parliament for Newala constituency. He is the current Minister of State in the President's Office for Good Governance.

References

1948 births
Living people
Chama Cha Mapinduzi MPs
Tanzanian MPs 2005–2010
Tanzanian MPs 2010–2015
Tanzanian MPs 2020–2025
Government ministers of Tanzania
Ilboru Secondary School alumni
University of Dar es Salaam alumni
Tanzanian Roman Catholics